Peter Talbot (1620 – November 1680) was the Roman Catholic Archbishop of Dublin from 1669 to his death in prison. He was a victim of the Popish Plot.

Early life 

Talbot was born at Malahide, County Dublin, Ireland, in 1620. He was the second of the eight sons of Sir William Talbot and his wife Alison (née Netterville). At an early age, he entered the Society of Jesus in Portugal. He was ordained a priest at Rome, and for some years thereafter held the chair of theology at the College of Antwerp. In the meantime during the Commonwealth period, Charles II and the royal family were compelled to seek refuge in Europe. Throughout the period of the king's exile, Talbot's brothers were attached to the royal court. The eldest brother, Sir Robert Talbot, 2nd Baronet, had held a high commission under James Butler, 1st Duke of Ormonde in the army in Ireland and was reckoned among the king's most confidential advisers. A younger brother, Richard Talbot, later Earl of Tyrconnel, was also devoted to the cause of the exiled monarch and stood high in royal favour.

Appointments 

Peter Talbot himself was constantly in attendance on Charles II and his court. On account of his knowledge of the continental languages, he was repeatedly dispatched to private embassies in Lisbon, Madrid, and Paris. On the return of the king to London, Talbot received an appointment as Queen's Almoner, but the Clarendon and Ormond faction, which was then predominant, feared his influence with the king. He was accused of conspiring with the aid of four Jesuits to assassinate the Duke of Ormond, and he was forced to seek safety by resigning his position at Court and retiring to the Continent. The king allowed him a pension of three hundred pounds a year. Before his return to England, Talbot had, with the approval of the General of the Jesuits, severed his connection with the Society. He was appointed Archbishop of Dublin on 11 January 1669, and was consecrated at Antwerp, assisted by the Bishops of Ghent and Ferns.

Catholic persecution 

During this period, the English treatment of Catholics in Ireland was more lenient than usual, owing to the known sympathies of the King (who entered the Catholic Church on his deathbed). In August 1670, Talbot held his first Diocesan Synod in Dublin. It was opened with High Mass, which for forty years many of the faithful had not witnessed. In the same year, an assembly of the archbishops and bishops and representatives of the clergy was held in Dublin. At this assembly, the question of precedence and of the primatial authority gave rise to considerable discussion and led to an embittered controversy between the Archbishop of Dublin and Oliver Plunkett, Archbishop of Armagh. The subject had been one of great controversy in the Middle Ages, but had been in abeyance for some time. Both prelates considered that they were asserting the rights of their respective sees, and each published a treatise on the subject. Another meeting of the Catholic gentry was convened by Talbot, at which it was resolved to send to the Court at London a representative who would seek redress for some of the grievances to which the Catholics of Ireland were subjected. This alarmed the Protestants in Ireland, who feared that the balance of power might shift to the Catholic majority. They protested to King Charles, and in 1673 some of the repressive measures against Irish Catholics were reinstated, and Talbot was compelled to seek safety in exile.

Exile, arrest and death 

During his banishment, he resided generally in Paris. In 1675, Talbot, in poor health, obtained permission to return to England, and for two years he resided with a family friend at Poole Hall in Cheshire. Towards the close of 1677, he petitioned the Crown for leave "to come to Ireland to die in his own country", and through the influence of James, Duke of York his request was granted. Shortly after that, the Popish Plot was hatched by Titus Oates, and information was forwarded to James Butler, 1st Duke of Ormonde as Lord Lieutenant of Ireland, to the effect that a rebellion was being planned in Ireland, that Peter Talbot was one of the accomplices, and that assassins had been hired to murder the Duke himself. Ormonde was in private deeply sceptical about the existence of the Plot, remarking of the alleged assassins that they were such "silly drunken vagabonds" that "no schoolboy would trust them to rob an orchard"; but he thought it politically unwise to show his doubts publicly. Though he was  sympathetic to Oliver Plunkett, who was also arrested in connection with the alleged Plot and was later to die on the scaffold, he had always been hostile to Talbot.

On 8 October 1678, Ormonde signed a warrant for the archbishop's arrest. He was arrested near Maynooth at the house of his brother, Colonel Richard Talbot, and was then moved to Dublin. For two years Talbot remained in prison, where he fell ill. Despite their long friendship, Charles II, fearful of the political repercussions, made no effort to save him. He died in prison at the beginning of November 1680.

Legacy 

Talbot is said to have been interred in the churchyard of St. Audoen's Church, close by the tomb of Rowland FitzEustace, 1st Baron Portlester. From his prison cell, Talbot had written on 12 April 1679, petitioning that a priest be allowed to visit him, as he was bedridden for months and was now in imminent danger of death. The petition was refused, but Oliver Plunkett was a prisoner in an adjoining cell, and on hearing of Talbot's dying condition forced his way through the warders and administered to the dying prelate the last consolations of the sacraments.

Notes

References 
 
 

Attribution

1620 births
1680 deaths
People from County Dublin  
People associated with the Popish Plot  
Roman Catholic archbishops of Dublin
Martyred Roman Catholic priests
17th-century Roman Catholic archbishops in Ireland
17th-century Roman Catholic martyrs
Irish people who died in prison custody
17th-century Irish Jesuits
People from Malahide
Younger sons of baronets